Robert Heap (2 January 1892–1979) was an English footballer who played in the Football League for Bury.

References

1890s births
1942 deaths
People from Haslingden
English footballers
Association football midfielders
English Football League players
Bury F.C. players